Mark Kosmos (October 28, 1945 – November 11, 2020) was an American football player in the ACFL, for the Pottstown Firebirds in 1968 and 1969 and in the CFL for eight years. Kosmos played linebacker for the Montreal Alouettes, Hamilton Tiger-Cats and Ottawa Rough Riders from 1970-1977. He played college football at the University of Oklahoma. Kosmos died in Ottawa in 2020 after an illness.

References

External links
Career Bio

1945 births
2020 deaths
American players of Canadian football
Canadian football linebackers
Hamilton Tiger-Cats players
Montreal Alouettes players
Oklahoma Sooners football players
Ottawa Rough Riders players
Players of American football from Baltimore
Sportspeople from Baltimore